James Foley may refer to:
 James Foley (bishop) (born 1948), Australian Roman Catholic bishop
 James Foley (cricketer) (1898–1969), Irish cricketer
 James Foley (director) (born 1953), American film director and screenwriter
 James Foley (journalist) (1973–2014), American journalist, beheaded by ISIL in 2014
 James A. Foley (1882–1946), American lawyer and politician from New York
 James Bradford Foley (1807–1886), United States Representative from Indiana
 James Brendan Foley (born 1957), U.S. diplomat
 James D. Foley (born 1942), American university professor in the field of human-computer interaction
 James L. Foley Jr. (1885–?), American politician and farmer
 James Thomas Foley (1910–1990), American judge

See also 
 Jim Foley (born 1946), Canadian football player